The Recreation Ground, currently known as The EBB Stadium at The Recreation Ground for sponsorship reasons and informally known as The Rec, is a football ground in Aldershot, Hampshire, England. Football matches have been played there since 1927 when Aldershot (later reformed as Aldershot Town) was founded. The ground hosted league football between 1932 and 1992 when Aldershot were members of the Football League. Its current tenants Aldershot Town have used the ground since forming in 1992 and the ground once again hosted league football between 2008 and 2013.

The ground currently has a capacity of 7,100, though the record attendance at the ground is 19,138, recorded when Aldershot played Carlisle United on 28 January 1970 in an FA Cup replay.

Current capacity 

The capacity of the ground was reduced at the end of the 2007–2008 season to 7,100. This includes a total away allocation of 1,100 of which around 250 is seated. The capacity was previously set at 7,500, however promotion to the Football League meant changes were introduced which resulted in the capacity being reduced.

Approximate capacity breakdown:
South Side: 1,580
East Bank: 4,180
North Stand: 1,740
High Street End: 200

Total: 7,600

History

Aldershot F.C. era 

Aldershot F.C. adopted the "Rec" as their home ground upon formation in December 1926. The Recreation Ground was owned by the local council and situated on Aldershot High Street. The first stand, the south stand, was opened at the beginning of the 1929–30 season and still remains today. A crowd of 3,522 witnessed the shots record a 2–1 victory over Norwich City on the day of its opening. The club's last game there was in the Football League Fourth Division against Lincoln City on 14 March 1992 – 11 days before their demise. However, one more competitive game did follow for the club - against Cardiff City, also in the league, at Ninian Park.

Aldershot Town F.C. era 

After the demise of Aldershot, the Recreation Ground remained without any tenants. Aldershot Town were formed soon after and consequently chose to adopt the Recreation Ground as their home.

In March 2018, Aldershot Town presented proposals for the redevelopment of the EBB Stadium to Rushmoor Borough Council which would see the potential development of a new stadium, containing both seating and standing areas, that will give the club a "long-term home from which to build our ambitions on the pitch".

Attendances

Club attendances from 1992 to 2009 
Average attendances since 1992.

Record attendances 

The following table summarises the top 10 attendances at the recreation ground for Aldershot Town, since reformation in 1992).

Facilities

North Stand 

This is the main stand of the Ground along one side of the pitch. It houses players changing rooms and the club's director's box and media center. Adjoined to the North stand is the club offices, which were used by both Aldershot F.C. and Aldershot Town F.C. directors. There is also a conference room and bar adjacent to the offices and behind the North stand which was built in the early 2000s. Originally it was used as a bar for supporters on matchdays until the club acquired the Black Bull Inn during the 2007–2008 season. As a result, it is mainly used for corporate hospitality.

The stand itself features a combination of terracing and seating:
 To the east of the stand is a large terraced area.
 To the west of the stand is a large terraced area with a disabled bay.
 In the centre of the stand is a large seated area, directors' area and media centre. Originally this was terraced before gradually seating replaced the terracing. However one small area to the west of the central area is still terraced and has yet to face conversion to seating.

East Bank 

East Bank is the largest stand of the Recreation Ground capable of holding several thousand fans. The design of the stand is unusual as it is not like most stands that have a flat roof, instead the stand roof is a barrel-shaped roof towards the rear, with a flat roof covering the lower parts of the East Bank. This is so because the East Bank originally had just the barrel shaped roof and it was not until later that a front flat roof was put on to cover the lower half of the East Bank.

South Stand 

The South Stand is the only all-seated stand at the ground, accommodating both home and away fans. The stand is the oldest at the ground, having been opened in the late 1920s shortly after Aldershot F.C. was formed. It has remained fairly untouched over the past 70 years, although an increase in ground safety regulations (especially after the Taylor report) has meant that some minor work has been carried out in order for the stand to remain in use.

Either side of the stand are open terraces. One of which is used by home fans - the south west terrace (known amongst fans as "The Slab") - and the other used by away fans.

High Street End 

Due to Football League regulations the High Street end is no longer accessible for supporters on match days. However, provision can be made for expanded capacity, as it was for the League Cup tie with Manchester United on 25 October 2011, where an extra 200 fans were allowed access, hence bringing capacity up to 7,300.

Other uses
 Reading Reserves - for the 2007–2008 season only.
 Chelsea Reserves From 2004/2005 - 2006/2007 season and from 2013/2014 - 2019/2020 season
England U17s
Army F.C.
Aldershot Town Reserves
Also hosts Aldershot and District League Cup Competition Final

Records 

Aldershot Town and the Recreation Ground hold the following attendance records in certain leagues or cup competitions.

References

External links 

  Shotsweb - Recreation Ground Guide

Aldershot F.C.
Aldershot Town F.C.
Chelsea F.C.
Football venues in England
Sports venues in Hampshire
Sports venues completed in 1927
English Football League venues